Swedish tourists Sven Urban Höglin, aged 23, and his fiancée Heidi Birgitta Paakkonen, aged 21, disappeared while tramping on the Coromandel Peninsula of New Zealand in 1989. Police, residents, and military personnel conducted the largest land-based search undertaken in New Zealand, attempting to find the couple. In December 1990, David Wayne Tamihere (born 1953) was convicted of murdering Höglin and Paakkonen, and sentenced to life imprisonment based largely on the testimony of three prison inmates. 

Höglin's body was discovered in 1991, revealing evidence which contradicted the police case against Tamihere, who has always maintained his innocence and filed a series of unsuccessful appeals during the 1990s. Tamihere was released on parole in November 2010 after serving twenty years. In 2017, Secret Witness C, one of the former prisoners who had testified against Tamihere at his murder trial, was found guilty of perjury. On 26 April 2018, the identity of Witness C was revealed as Robert Conchie Harris, who had originally been convicted of the double murder of a couple in 1983.

Disappearance
On 8 April 1989, backpacking tourists Sven Höglin and Heidi Paakkonen of Storfors, Värmland County, Sweden, went into the bush near Thames, a town on the Coromandel Peninsula on New Zealand's North Island. The couple vanished and were reported missing in May. Their disappearance led to an intense investigation under the name Operation Stockholm and attracted substantial media interest. Police, local residents, search and rescue and military personnel carried out the largest land-based search undertaken in New Zealand, performing grid-searches centred on Crosbie's Clearing, 12 km from Thames.

David Tamihere

Background 
David Tamihere is the brother of former Labour MP John Tamihere. He had a prior conviction for the manslaughter of Mary Barcham, a 23-year-old stripper in Auckland, whom he killed in 1972 when he was aged 18 by hitting her on the head with a rifle. In April 1986 Tamihere broke into an Auckland house, where he raped and threatened a 47-year-old woman for over six hours. He pleaded guilty but fled while on bail, and was living rough in the bush on the Coromandel Peninsula when Höglin and Paakkonen disappeared. Tamihere was not found until 1989, after which he was jailed for six and a half years for the 1986 offences. In 1992, he was found guilty of assaulting a 62-year-old woman in her home in 1985.

Trial 
On 10 April 1989, Tamihere came across Höglin and Paakkonen's white Subaru, which was parked at Crosbies Clearing and 'loaded with gear'. Tamihere broke into the car, planning on driving up to Auckland, but the next day he gave three visitors to the area a tour of the peninsula. He drove one of the tourists to Auckland the day after that and dumped the car at Auckland railway station.

Tamihere was picked up on the 1986 rape charge on 24 May 1989, two days before the story broke that Höglin and Paakkonen were missing. His link to the couple surfaced when one of the three tourists recognised photographs of their Subaru and told police in June that Tamihere had given him a ride in it. Tamihere, already in prison on the rape charge, was then charged with murdering Höglin and Paakkonen. 

At Tamihere's trial in October 1990, three witnesses–fellow inmates of Tamihere's, granted name suppression by the court–gave evidence that he had confessed the murder to them. One of the inmates told the court that Tamihere claimed to have tied Höglin to a tree and sexually assaulted him before raping Paakkonen. Two trampers also identified Tamihere as a man they saw with a woman believed to be Paakkonen in a remote clearing. In December 1990, the jury found Tamihere guilty of the murder and theft, and he was sentenced to life imprisonment with a ten-year non-parole period.

Appeals 

Paakkonen's body has never been found. On 10 October 1991, ten months after Tamihere's conviction, pig hunters discovered Höglin's skeleton near Whangamatā, 73 km from where police alleged the murders took place. On the body was a watch which police had claimed at his trial Tamihere had given to his son following the murders. Discovery of the body also contradicted the testimony of a fellow prison inmate who said Tamihere had confessed to cutting up the bodies and throwing them into the ocean. Based on these evidential discrepancies, Tamihere appealed his convictions. The Court of Appeal of New Zealand rejected the case in May 1992 arguing there was "nothing substantive in defence claims that the skeleton revealed new evidence" and that the Crown had provided "convincing circumstantial proof". In 1994, Tamihere was also denied leave to appeal to the Privy Council.

Parole 
On 3 November 2010, Tamihere was granted parole, to be released on 15 November. At a parole board hearing on 11 November 2011, he was said to have spent several months in hospital due to ongoing health issues but was otherwise actively involved in marae activities and carving, being actively supported by his family. His parole conditions were relaxed.

Tamihere continues to maintain his innocence, claiming he was framed by police. A 2012 interview with TV One's Sunday program, in which he advanced this claim, was widely watched with 413,300 viewers. During filming, the TV One crew flew him by helicopter over areas prohibited to him by his parole conditions. While the parole board chose not to revoke his parole, police charged him in relation to the incident.

Royal prerogative of mercy 
On 21 April 2020, Tamihere was granted a royal prerogative of mercy by the Governor-General, Dame Patsy Reddy, on the advice of the Minister of Justice, Andrew Little, which means that the case will be referred back to the Court of Appeal.

Secret Witness C 
Three prison inmates testified against Tamihere at his 1990 trial. One of them, known as Secret Witness C, claimed that Tamihere confessed to him in prison that he had beaten Höglin over the head with a lump of wood and dumped the couple's bodies at sea. He also claimed Tamihere told him he gave Höglin's watch to his son. This account was contradicted by evidence discovered along with Höglin's remains in October 1991.

On 25 August 1995, five years after the trial, Witness C swore an affidavit retracting this statement, saying police had fed him the information and told him: “a sum of money up to $100,000 was available should I decide to give a statement helpful to the Police". The prisoner also claimed police indicated they would support his early release at his parole hearing if he did what they wanted.

The existence of this affidavit only came to light a year later on 17 July 1996, when Witness C spoke to broadcaster Paul Holmes in a prison telephone interview. He publicly admitted to lying at Tamihere's trial and confirmed that the affidavit he had signed in 1995, stating that he had lied and given false evidence, was the truth. He told Holmes that his original testimony against Tamihere had been "playing on his mind" and "they definitely have an innocent man inside". The publicity created immediate concerns about police conduct in the case, leading a Member of Parliament to request a ministerial inquiry. The Independent Police Conduct Authority (IPCA) was also asked to investigate police handling of the case. The IPCA eventually concluded that the police had not been guilty of any wrongdoing, and Minister of Justice Doug Graham rejected a call for further inquiry.

Witness C later tried to withdraw his affidavit and claimed that his original trial testimony was the correct version of events. He said he only signed the affidavit because he and his family were under threat of violent reprisal because of his reputation as a jailhouse "nark". Twenty years later, long after Tamihere had been released on parole, jailhouse lawyer Arthur Taylor brought a private prosecution against Witness C for perjury. In August 2017, Witness C, who still had name suppression, was found guilty on eight charges of perjury. Taylor was represented in court by lawyer Murray Gibson, who said the verdict called into question everything about Mr. Tamihere's conviction.

On 25 October 2017, Witness C was sentenced to eight years, seven months on each of the eight charges of perjury, the sentences to be served concurrently.

On 26 April 2018, the identity of Witness C was revealed as Robert Conchie Harris. He had originally been convicted of the double murder of a couple in 1983. Harris died on 17 September 2021 at Northland Region Corrections Facility.

Other developments
In November 2009, New Zealand journalist Pat Booth, formerly of the Auckland Star, alleged that the Crown prosecutor and the police inquiry head in the Tamihere case were both leading figures in the earlier prosecution of Arthur Allan Thomas, which had involved the planting of evidence, perjury, and withholding of information and evidence from the defence.

In May 2017, Alan Ford, an experienced bushman, found a plastic bag containing three pairs of women's leggings in the rugged bush on the Whangamatā Peninsula about 15 km from where Höglin's remains had been found. Ford took the bag and clothing to Whangamatā police station. Two months later, a police constable emailed him saying that his senior officer had "no interest in the items" and that they wouldn't be testing them. The constable said Ford could pick up the items the next time he came to town. On 7 July, Ford went to the police station but was told the items had been destroyed on 9 June, a month before the constable had indicated by email that the items still existed.

Media interest
The TV3 show Inside New Zealand: What's Your Verdict? re-examined the case with a television jury in 2007.

Filmmaker Bryan Bruce made a documentary Murder, They Said in 1996 
examining the case, and wrote the book Hard Cases, which puts forward the theory Tamihere did not act alone, on the basis that as there were no defensive cuts to the bones of his hands, Höglin may have been held from behind while being stabbed from the front.

In 1999, Leanne Pooley made a television documentary Relative Guilt about the impact on Tamihere's extended family of his arrest, trial and conviction. The documentary won Best Documentary at the 2000 Qantas Media Awards.

The case was covered in episode 209 of the true crime podcast Casefile.

See also
List of solved missing person cases
Murder of Grace Millane

References

1980s missing person cases
1989 murders in New Zealand
1990 in New Zealand law
Coromandel Peninsula
Couples
Missing person cases in New Zealand
Murder convictions without a body
Murder in New Zealand
Swedish murder victims
Swedish people murdered abroad